Salt is a 2006 American film written and directed by Bradford Tatum. It is about an abusive husband, and the revenge his wife takes on him.

Plot
Randal (Bradford Tatum) abuses his wife Phoebe (Alexandra Wilson). She starts an affair with his sister, and together they plot revenge on him.

Cast
 Bradford Tatum as Randal
 Alexandra Wilson as Phoebe
 Stacy Haiduk as West
 Judith Hoag as Rebecca

External links
 
 

2006 films
American thriller films
2000s thriller films
2000s American films